The .38-56 Winchester Center Fire or .38-56 Winchester cartridge was introduced in 1887 by Winchester for the Winchester Model 1886, and was also used in the Marlin Model of 1895.

Project and history
Production of Winchester Model 1886 rifles chambered in this cartridge ceased in 1910 due to lack of demand, and most commercial production of the cartridge itself ceased in the 1930s. New production loaded cartridges and unloaded brass cases are rare and are often created using reformed .45-70 brass. The cartridge was originally intended to outperform the similar .38-55 Winchester but in reality had very similar ballistics despite using more gunpowder.

Dimensions

See also
List of Winchester Center Fire cartridges
List of cartridges by caliber
List of rifle cartridges
9 mm caliber

References

External links

 Winchester Lever Guns & Their Black Powder Cartridges 
 

Pistol and rifle cartridges
Winchester Repeating Arms Company cartridges